Francisco Fernández, (1606 in Madrid – 1646) who was brought up in the school of Vincenzo Carducho, was one of the most ingenious artists of his time, and his talent gained great reputation for him at an early age. He was employed by Philip IV in the palaces at Madrid, and in the convent of La Victoria are pictures by him of the Death of St. Francis of Paola, and St. Joachim and St. Anne. He also etched five spirited plates of allegories for Carducho's Dialogos de la Pintura, 1633. He was killed in a quarrel by Francisco de Baras.

Notes

References
Angulo Íñiguez, Diego, y Pérez Sánchez, Alfonso E.: Pintura madrileña del primer tercio del siglo XVII, 1969, Madrid: Instituto Diego Velázquez, CSIC,
Antonio Palomino, An account of the lives and works of the most eminent Spanish painters, sculptors and architects, 1724, first English translation, 1739, p. 35
Palomino, Antonio (1988). El museo pictórico y escala óptica III. El parnaso español pintoresco laureado. Madrid : Aguilar S.A.. .
Pérez Sánchez, Alfonso E. (1992). Baroque Paintings in Spain, 1600-1750. Madrid : Ediciones Cátedra. .

Attribution:
 

1606 births
1646 deaths
17th-century Spanish painters
Spanish male painters
Artists from Madrid